The following is a list of all team-to-team transactions that have occurred in the National Hockey League during the 2011–12 NHL season. It lists what team each player has been traded to, signed by, or claimed by, and for which player(s) or draft pick(s), if applicable. Players who have retired are also listed.

Retirement

Free agency

Trades between teams

June

July

August

September

October

November

December

January

February

March

May

June

See also
2011–12 NHL season
2011 NHL Entry Draft
2012 NHL Entry Draft
2011 in sports
2012 in sports
2010–11 NHL transactions
2012–13 NHL transactions

References

TSN transactions
Official NHL Free Agent signings
The Hockey News transactions

Transactions
National Hockey League transactions